Oxynoemacheilus shehabi is a species of stone loach from the upper Orontes in southern Syria.

The fish is named in honor of Adwan Shehab (1967-2015). Adwan was killed in the streets of Dara’a as a result of the conflict in Syria.

References

shehabi
Fish of Asia
Fish of Syria
Taxa named by Jörg Freyhof
Taxa named by Matthias F. Geiger
Fish described in 2021